Lakeview Independent School District was a school district headquartered in Lakeview in Hall County, Texas.

Declining student enrollment caused the district to consider consolidating with the larger Memphis Independent School District in 1999. An election was held on August 14 of that year. In order for the consolidation process to move forward, voters in both districts would have to approve the measure. Of the 59 votes cast in Lakeview ISD, 49 (83.1%) favored consolidation. In Memphis, 232 of 239 (97.1%) approved.

On July 1, 2000 it merged into the Memphis Independent School District.

Schools

 Lakeview Elementary School
 Lakeview Junior High School
 Lakeview High School

References

External links

 Map of Hall County showing area school districts prior to the LISD merger - Texas Education Agency - Web version

Former school districts in Texas
School districts in Hall County, Texas
2000 disestablishments in Texas
School districts disestablished in 2000